Five Crooked Lines is the sixth studio album by Canadian rock band Finger Eleven. The album was released July 31, 2015. This is the first album without drummer Rich Beddoe after his departure in 2013. Instead, drums were provided by Chris Powell.

Writing and recording
On April 5, 2013, the band posted on Twitter about the status of their upcoming album stating, "The official inertia of our new album is growing". Towards the end of the year, the band parted ways with longtime drummer Rich Beddoe.
In November 2014, the band announced via their Facebook page that Chris Powell will provide the drums for the album. They recorded the album between November 8, 2014 and November 28, 2014.
On January 29, 2015, the band said the album was in the final stages of production.
On April 25, 2015, the band announced an open casting call for the filming of the video for the new album's first single. The song appears to be titled "Wolves and Doors". The music video premiered on Finger Eleven's VEVO page in June 2015; it had been seen 100,000 times by July 31, 2015.

Critical reception
The album received mixed reviews. James Christopher Monger of allMusic gave a review about the album indicating, "...The resulting Five Crooked Lines doesn't deviate too much from the band's post-grunge past, but it is built from more volatile stuff." Ultimate Guitar gave a mixed review about the album stated, "...Five Crooked Lines is not a completely avoidable album, but it's nothing to get that excited about."

Track listing

Personnel
Finger Eleven
Scott Anderson - vocals
James Black - guitar, vocals
Rick Jackett - guitar
Sean Anderson - bass

Additional personnel
Chris Powell - drums

Charts

References

2015 albums
Finger Eleven albums